Nivan-e Nar (also Romanized as Nīvān-e Nār and Nīvān Nār; also known as Nīvān Tār) is a village in Nivan Rural District, in the Central District of Golpayegan County, Isfahan Province, Iran. At the 2006 census, its population was 1,145, in 347 families.

References 

Populated places in Golpayegan County